The Lambda Literary Award for Lesbian Poetry is an annual literary award, presented by the Lambda Literary Foundation to a lesbian-themed book of poetry by a female writer. At the first two Lambda Literary Awards in 1989 and 1990, a single award for LGBT Poetry, irrespective of gender, was presented. Beginning with the 3rd Lambda Literary Awards in 1991, the poetry award was split into two separate awards for Lesbian Poetry and Gay Poetry, which have been presented continuously since then except at the 20th Lambda Literary Awards in 2008, when a merged LGBTQ poetry award was again presented for that year only.

Recipients

References

External links

 

American poetry awards
Lesbian poetry
LGBT poetry
Lists of LGBT-related award winners and nominees
English-language literary awards
Lesbian-related mass media in the United States
Literary awards honoring women